Justice Nichols or Nicholls may refer to"

David A. Nichols, associate justice of the Maine Supreme Judicial Court
Francis T. Nicholls, chief justice of the Louisiana Supreme Court
Horace Elmo Nichols, chief justice of the Supreme Court of Georgia
Hugh L. Nichols, chief justice of the Ohio Supreme Court